Serhat Çakmak (born 16 May 1995) is a Turkish footballer who plays as a forward for SV Nootdorp. He is a Turkish youth international having earned caps with the under-15 and under-16 teams.

Club career

Early career
Çakmak is a product of the Ajax Youth Academy, and was also a part of Ajax squad in the 2013–14 UEFA Youth League. In 2014, he left the club to join Trabzonspor, signing a three-year contract with the Turkish club after rejecting interest from Beşiktaş J.K., Fenerbahçe, Galatasaray. Following the departure of Trabzonspor manager Hami Mandıralı, Çakmak was cut from the squad under newly appointed manager Vahid Halilhodžić. He returned to Amsterdam, joining Ajax Zaterdag competing in the Topklasse. He made his debut for the amateur side on 20 October 2014 in the third round KNVB Cup home match against Koninklijke HFC which ended in a 2–0 loss. He made his Topklasse debut against the Kozakken Boys on 25 October 2014 in another 2–0 loss.

Bayrampaşaspor
On 2 February 2015 it was announced that Çakmak had signed a contract with TFF Second League side Bayrampaşaspor. He made his first appearance on 15 February 2015 in a 2–1 victory against Menemen Belediyespor.

FC Utrecht
Çakmak went back to his native Netherlands to play for Utrecht in the Eredivisie on Saturday 13 February 2016.

SV Nootdorp
In October 2019, Çakmak joined Dutch club SV Nootdorp.

Career statistics

1 Includes UEFA Champions League, UEFA Europa League matches.

2 Includes Johan Cruijff Shield matches.

References

1995 births
Living people
Footballers from Rotterdam
Dutch footballers
Turkish footballers
Dutch people of Turkish descent
Turkey youth international footballers
AFC Ajax (amateurs) players
Trabzonspor footballers
Jong FC Utrecht players
Tepecikspor footballers
Eerste Divisie players
Derde Divisie players
TFF Second League players
Association football forwards
DHSC players